The twentieth season of the Case Closed anime was directed by Kōjin Ochi and produced by TMS Entertainment and Yomiuri Telecasting Corporation. The series is based on Gosho Aoyama's Case Closed manga series. In Japan, the series is titled  but was changed due to legal issues with the title Detective Conan. The series focuses on the adventures of teenage detective Shinichi Kudo who was turned into a child by a poison called APTX 4869, but continues working as a detective under the alias Conan Edogawa.

The episodes use nine pieces of theme music: four opening and five ending themes. The first opening theme is "tear drops" by Caos Caos Caos and is used up to episode 612. The second opening theme is "Don't Wanna Lie" by B'z from episodes 613 to 626. The third opening theme is "Misty Mystery" by Garnet Crow from episodes 627 to 641. The fourth opening is "Miss Mystery" by Breakerz is used from 642 and onwards. The first ending theme,  by Hundred Percent Free is used up to 609. The fourth ending theme is "Your Best Friend" by Mai Kuraki from episode 629 to 643.

The season aired between February 19, 2011 to February 11, 2012 on Nippon Television Network System in Japan. The season was later collected and released in ten DVD compilations by Shogakukan between January 27, 2012 and October 26, 2012, in Japan.



Episode list

References

2011 Japanese television seasons
2012 Japanese television seasons
Season20

it:Episodi di Detective Conan (sedicesima stagione)